Senator Aguilar may refer to:

Irene Aguilar (born 1960), Colorado State Senate
Ray Aguilar (born 1947), Nebraska State Senate